Epistrophella euchromus is a European species of hoverfly.

References

Diptera of Europe
Syrphinae
Syrphini
Insects described in 1885
Taxa named by Ferdinand Kowarz